Armin Pumpanmuang (born April 19, 1987) is a Thai Muay Thai kickboxer. He is a former WPMF World Welterweight Champion (147 lbs).

Biography and career
Born and raised in the Chana district of the Songkhla province, Armin practiced Muay Thai from an early age, in addition to the sport's historical form: Muay boran.

Armin first signed with the Sasiprapha Gym. He began fighting in the 40 kg division. Later, Armin moved to the Kiatkumtorn gym, where he trained under Jomhod Kiatadisak.  At the same time, he began fighting at Omnoi Stadium. He then moved to ‘Muaythai Plaza 2004-Windysport' to continue his training.  However, he failed to become the Omnoi Stadium champion when he lost to Yordsanpol Sitsanpol in their title fight.

From then onwards, Armin trained with Windysport, where he began achieving success. He was pushed to fight in the Pumpanmuang promotion's fights, scoring victories against the likes of Sammuk Sasiprapa Gym, Plarnchai Sor Kamsingh, and Chokechuchai Sor Sanchai in the 'Bangrajan fight'.

Armin was very successful at the start of 2011. After losing in the World Amateur Muay Thai tournament in the 71-kilogram division, he won in the Asian Muay Thai Championships in the same weight division. Armin also won the gold medal in the Arafura Games in Australia.  He also won a Z-1 tournament and the WPMF Muay Thai world championship in France.

Armin went on to gain international exposure by fighting in several countries, such as Germany, Denmark, Switzerland, Australia, Japan, and China.

He defeated Faizal Ramli by decision at the Thailand vs. Asia event in Malaysia on October 9, 2012.

He lost to Roman Mailov via KO due to a knee to the body in the extension round at W5 Fighter 8 in Moscow, Russia on November 8, 2012.

He TKO'd Sekou Dembele in round two at Le Choc des Légendes 2013 in Paris, France, on March 9, 2013.

Armin was to fight Sean Kearney at Muaythai Superfight on May 13, 2013 but the fight fell through.

He outpointed Mohammed Doroudian at THAI FIGHT Extreme 2013: Pattani in Pattani, Thailand on September 22, 2013.

He defeated Ginga Muay Farang (Gian Carlo Corba) by first-round TKO at Combat Banchamek event in Chiang Rai, Thailand on 15 August 2014 

At Ring War 2015, Armin defeated Luca Tagliarno to win the WBC Muay Thai International 70 kg Championship.

On August 10, 2017, he faced Cai Liangchan at CKF China Kungfu International Challenge-Macau in Macau for the CKF Intercontinental 80 kg Championship. Armin lost by first-round TKO.

Titles and achievements

Muay Thai
WBC Muay Thai 
2015 WBC Muay Thai -70 kg International Champion
World Pro League Muaythai
2011 World Pro League Muaythai World Welterweight Champion (147 lbs)
World Professional Muaythai Federation 
2011 W.P.M.F. Muaythai World Welterweight Champion (147 lbs)
Miri City Z1 World Muay Thai Series 
2010 Miri City Z1 World Muay Thai Series champion
Regional
South Thailand Champion

Amateur Muay Thai
 Asian Championships 
 Gold medal in Asian Championships at Iran  (71 kg)
 Arafura Games 
 Gold medal in Arafura Games at Australia  (71 kg)

Kickboxing record

|-  style="background:#fbb;"
| 2017-08-10 || Loss ||align=left| Cai Liangchan || CKF China Kungfu International Challenge-Macau || Macau, China || TKO (Low Kick) || 1 || 
|-
! style=background:white colspan=9 |
|-  style="background:#fbb;"
| 2017-02-18 || Loss ||align=left| Anouar Khamlali || Ring War || Monza, Italy || TKO (Ref.Stoppage) || 2 || 
|-  style="background:#cfc;"
| 2016-12-24 || Win||align=left| Said Amran || CGBQ || Taizhou, China || Decision  || 3 || 3:00
|-  style="background:#cfc;"
| 2016-07-02 || Win||align=left| Jiao Fukai ||WLF Glory of Heroes 3 || China || Ex.R  TKO (Ref.Stoppage) || 4 || 3:00
|-  style="background:#cfc;"
| 2016-02-06 || Win||align=left| Armen Petrosyan ||Ring War 3 || Monza, Italy || Decision  || 5 || 3:00
|-  style="background:#fbb;"
| 2016-01-09 || Loss ||align=left| Dzianis Zuev || Kunlun Fight 36 || Shanghai, China || Decision  || 3 || 3:00 
|-  style="background:#cfc;"
| 2015-12-05 || Win ||align=left| Sasha Moisa || Workpoint Super Muaythai || Bangkok, Thailand || Decision || 3 || 3:00
|-  style="background:#fbb;"
| 2015-10-22 || Loss ||align=left| Wanmechai Menayothin || Thai Fight || Bangkok, Thailand || KO (left high kick)  || 2 ||
|-  style="background:#fbb;"
| 2015-06 || Loss ||align=left| Steeve Valente || Ultimate K-1 Championship || Strasbourg, France || KO (fell from the ring) || 3 || 
|-
! style=background:white colspan=9 |
|-  style="background:#fbb;"
| 2015-04-14 || Loss ||align=left| Yodkhunpon Sitmonchai ||  || Bang Saphan District, Thailand || KO || 3 || 
|-
|-  style="background:#cfc;"
| 2015-02-28 || Win ||align=left| Luca Tagliarino || Ring War 2015 || Sesto San Giovanni, Italy || TKO ||  || 
|-
! style=background:white colspan=9 |
|-  style="background:#fbb;"
| 2014-11-22 || Loss ||align=left| Teded Sitjakong || Isuzu Cup, Omnoi Stadium || Samut Sakhon, Thailand || Decision || 5 || 3:00
|-  style="background:#fbb;"
| 2014-10-18 || Loss ||align=left| Wanchalerm Aooddonmuang || Isuzu Cup, Omnoi Stadium || Samut Sakhon, Thailand || KO (Elbow) || 3 || 3:00
|-  style="background:#cfc;"
| 2014-08-15 || Win ||align=left| Gian Carlo Corba (Ginga Muay Farang) || Combat Banchamek || Chiang Rai, Thailand || TKO || 1 || 3:00
|-  style="background:#fbb;"
| 2014-05-03 || Loss ||align=left| Moses Tor. Sangtiennoi || Isuzu Cup, Omnoi Stadium || Samut Sakhon, Thailand || Decision || 5 || 3:00
|-  style="background:#cfc;"
| 2013-09-22 || Win ||align=left| Mohammed Doroudian || THAI FIGHT Extreme 2013: Pattani || Pattani, Thailand || Decision || 3 || 3:00
|-  style="background:#cfc;"
| 2013-03-09 || Win ||align=left| Sekou Dembele || Le Choc des Légendes 2013 || Paris, France || TKO || 2 || 
|-  style="background:#cfc;"
| 2013-01-01 || Win ||align=left| Zhang de Zheng || Kung Fu vs Muay Thai 2013 || Fujian, China || KO (Flying-Knee) || 1 || 
|-  style="background:#cfc;"
| 2012-11-24 || Win ||align=left| Stephane Celeste || Frank Lee's Muay Thai Mayhem 3 || Edmonton, Alberta || Decision || 5 || 3:00
|-  style="background:#fbb;"
| 2012-11-08 || Loss ||align=left| Roman Mailov || W5 Fighter 8 || Moscow, Russia || KO (knee to the body) || 4 || 
|-  style="background:#cfc;"
| 2012-10-09 || Win ||align=left| Faizal Ramli || Thailand vs Asia || Kuala Lumpur, Malaysia || Decision || 5 || 3:00
|-  style="background:#cfc;"
| 2012-09-19 || Win ||align=left| Raphaël Llodra || THAI FIGHT Extreme 2012: France || Lyon, France || TKO (cut) || 3 || 
|-  style="background:#cfc;"
| 2012-08-17 || Win ||align=left| Abdallah Mabel || THAI FIGHT Extreme 2012: England || Leicester, England || TKO (Ref. Stoppage) || 2 ||
|-  style="background:#cfc;"
| 2012-04-17 || Win ||align=left| Ibrahim Chiahou || THAI FIGHT Extreme 2012: Pattaya || Pattaya, Thailand || TKO (Ref. Stoppage) || 1 || 
|-  style="background:#cfc;"
| 2012-03-31 || Win ||align=left| Cedric Flament || Fight Fever 5 || Luxembourg, Luxembourg || TKO (Corner Stoppage) || 4 || 
|-  style="background:#cfc;"
| 2011-12-30 || Win ||align=left| Charles François || Gladiator's War || Pattaya, Thailand || Decision || 5 || 3:00
|-
! style=background:white colspan=9 |
|-  style="background:#cfc;"
| 2011-10-15 || Win ||align=left| Faton Vukshiraj || Lions FC || Neuchâtel, Switzerland || Decision || 5 || 3:00
|-  style="background:#cfc;"
| 2011-10-01 || Win ||align=left|  Morgan Adrar || Röschtigraben 2: Derby || Lausanne, Switzerland || TKO (cut) || 2 || 3:00
|-  style="background:#cfc;"
| 2011-09-25 || Win ||align=left| Abdoul Toure || THAI FIGHT 2011: First Round; 70 kg Superfight || Bangkok, Thailand || Decision || 3 || 3:00
|-  style="background:#cfc;"
| 2011-07-23 || Win ||align=left| Hong Guang || Thailand Versus Challenger Series 2011 || Bangkok, Thailand || Decision || 5 || 3:00
|-  style="background:#cfc;"
| 2011-05-21 || Win ||align=left| Charles François || Les Rois du Ring || Châlons, France || KO (Left high kick) || 1 || 
|-
! style=background:white colspan=9 |
|-  style="background:#c5d2ea;"
| 2011-05-01 || Draw ||align=left| Yang Zhuo || Wu Lin Feng ||Nanchang China  || Decision || 4 || 3:00
|-  style="background:#cfc;"
| 2010-10-23 || Win ||align=left| Alexandre Boyancé || Roeschtigrabe Derby || Uetendorf, Switzerland || KO (high kick) || 2 || 
|-  style="background:#cfc;"
| 2010-06-25 || Win ||align=left| Ahmed Saadi || Miri City Z1 World Muaythai Series, Final || Sarawak, Malaysia || TKO || 2 ||
|-
! style=background:white colspan=9 |
|-  style="background:#cfc;"
| 2010-06-25 || Win ||align=left| Mark Sarracino || Miri City Z1 World Muaythai Series, Semi Final || Sarawak, Malaysia || Decision ||  ||
|-  style="background:#fbb;"
| 2010-03-21 || Loss ||align=left| Zhang Kai Yin || China-Thai 8-Man Tournament, Semi Final || Chongqing, China || Decision || 3 || 3:00
|-  style="background:#cfc;"
| 2010-03-19 || Win ||align=left| Wang Guan || China-Thai 8-Man Tournament, Quarter Final || Chongqing, China || Decision || 3 || 3:00
|-  style="background:#fbb;"
| 2009-03-14 || Loss ||align=left| Petchsila Rawai Muay Thai || Muay Thai Against Drugs || Phuket, Thailand || Decision ||  ||
|-
| colspan=9 | Legend:

See also
List of male kickboxers

References

1987 births
Living people
Welterweight kickboxers
Middleweight kickboxers
Armin Pumpanmuang
Armin Pumpanmuang
Kunlun Fight kickboxers